The 10th Presidium of the Supreme People's Assembly (SPA) was elected by the 1st Session of the 10th Supreme People's Assembly of North Korea on 5 September 1998. It was replaced on 3 September 2003 by the 11th SPA Presidium.

Officers

President

Vice president

Honorary Vice President

Secretary-General

Members

References

Citations

Bibliography
Books:
 

10th Supreme People's Assembly
Presidium of the Supreme People's Assembly
1998 establishments in North Korea
2003 disestablishments in North Korea